The Boston Globe–Horn Book Awards are a set of American literary awards conferred by 
The Boston Globe and The Horn Book Magazine annually from 1967. One book is recognized in each of four categories: Fiction and Poetry, Nonfiction, and Picture Book. The official website calls the awards "among the most prestigious honors in children's and young adult literature".

The Awards follow a school-year calendar. Taking the 2011–2012 cycle for illustration: books published June 2011 to May 2012 were eligible; submissions from publishers were accepted until May 15; the awards and honors were announced during June (when U.S. school years end), only one to twelve months after the eligible books were released.

From 1967 to 1975 there were only two award categories, fiction and picture book. The Nonfiction award was introduced in 1976 and the fiction category was revised to "Fiction and Poems" in 2001, when that award recognized Carver: A Life in Poems by Marilyn Nelson. There have been five "Special Citations": fourth awards conferred in five different years from 1977 to 1999.

Generally the books under consideration have been submitted by their publishers but the panel of judges may honor any eligible book. Before 2011–2012 the publishers were permitted to submit only a limited number of candidates.

Winners

Repeat winners

Author Virginia Hamilton and illustrator Ed Young have both won three Awards, both in two categories.

Mitsumasa Anno, Avi, Jean Fritz, Cynthia Rylant, Allen Say and Vera B. Williams have all won two Awards.

See also

Newbery medal
Caldecott medal

References

External links
 
Boston Globe–Horn Book Award at lovethebook
Boston Globe–Horn Book Awards at smallfrybooks

American children's literary awards
The Boston Globe
Literary awards by magazines and newspapers
Awards established in 1967
1967 establishments in Massachusetts